This is a list of the mayors of Calais since 1878.

Jean François Mussel (1878–1879)
Marie Pierre Darnel (1879–1882)
Antoine Louis Debette (1882–1882)
Omer Julien Dewavrin (1882–1885)
Charles Ravisse (1885–1885)
Paul Gustave Van Grutten (1885–1888)
Georges Wintrebert (1888–1889)
Émile Paclot (1889–1892)
Omer Julien Dewavrin (1892–1896)
Émile Salembier (1896–1898)
Alfred Delcluze (1898–1900)
Pierre Noyon (1900–1901)
Edmond Basset (1901–1908)
Émile Salembier (1908–1912)
Charles Morieux (1912–1919)
Joseph Duquenoy-Martel (1919–1923)
Hans Apeness (1923–1925)
Léon Vincent (17 May 1925 – 7 September 1933)
Victor Mussel (7 September 1933 – 31 October 1933)
Léon Vincent (31 October 1933 – 11 March 1934)
Jules Lefebvre (11 March 1934 – 19 May 1935)
Lucien Vadez (19 May 1935 – 2 September 1939)
André Gerschel (1939–1940)
Edgar Verschoore (1940–1944)
Georges François (1944)
Jacques Vendroux (1944 – 30 October 1945)
Hubert Défachelles (30 October 1945 – 19 October 1947)
Gaston Berthe (19 October 1947 – February 1950)
Henri Joseph Mullard (February 1950)
Gaston Berthe (February 1950 – 28 March 1952)
André Parmentier (28 March 1952 – 15 March 1959)
Jacques Vendroux (15 March 1959 – 15 March 1969)
Charles Beaugrand (15 March 1969 – 14 March 1971)
Jean-Jacques Barthe (14 March 1971 – 18 March 2001)
Jacky Hénin (18 March 2001 – 16 March 2008)
Natacha Bouchart (16 March 2008–

References

Calais
Calais